Loughborough Foxes Women & Girls Football Club is a football club based in Loughborough, Leicestershire, England. They are currently members of the FA Women's National League North and play at the Loughborough University Stadium.

History
The club was founded in 1999 as Shepshed Foxes by Gail and Paul Fox, who wanted to give girls in the surrounding area an opportunity to play football, before becoming Loughborough Foxes in 2002.

After playing in local leagues for much of the first 15 years of their history, Loughborough were promoted to the FA Women's Premier League Northern Division (the 3rd tier of women's football) for the first time in 2015 from the Midlands Division One but would suffer relegation back to the 4th tier after just one season. The Foxes returned to the now renamed FA Women's National League in 2018 having secured promotion and the Midlands Division One title with a record of 21 wins and 1 draw from 22 games.

In January 2019, Loughborough Foxes player and junior team coach Molly Webb died aged 25, with Director of Football Steve Wilkinson describing her as "a joy to spend time with; she was vibrant, enthusiastic, a motivator and someone you want in your team whatever the situation.". The Foxes would end their first season back at the third tier of women's football in 7th place in the 2018–19 FA Women's National League Southern Division before being realigned to the Northern Division for the following season.

Players

Current squad

 (on loan from Leicester City)

 (on loan from Leicester City)

Recent seasons

Records
Best League performance: 7th FA Women's National League South (third level), 2018–19
Best FA Women's Cup performance: Fourth Round, 2015–16 & 2018–19

References

External links
Official website

Football clubs in Leicestershire
Association football clubs established in 1999
1999 establishments in England
Sport in Loughborough
Women's football clubs in England